Pablo Salazar may refer to:
 Pablo Salazar Mendiguchía (born 1954), Mexican politician
 Pablo Salazar (born 1982), Costa Rican football player